The 2014–15 season is Omonia's 60th season in the Cypriot First Division and 66th year in existence as a football club.

Current squad

 
 
 

Source: omonoia.com.cy

Out on loan

Active internationals

Foreign players

Squad changes

Squad stats

Top scorers

Last updated: 1 September 2014
Source: Match reports in Competitive matches, omonoia.com.cy

Captains

Pre-season and friendlies
Kick-off times are in EET.

Competitions

Overall

Cypriot First Division

Classification

Results summary

Results by round

Matches
Kick-off times are in EET.

Regular season

Play-offs table

Championship group

UEFA Europa League

Second qualifying round

Third qualifying round

Play-off round

Cypriot Cup

First round

References

AC Omonia seasons
Omonia